Västtrafik is the agency responsible for public transport services involving buses, ferries, trains, and the Gothenburg tram network in the county of Västra Götaland, Sweden (plus Kungsbacka Municipality). It was established with the Västra Götaland County on 1 January 1998. Until 31 December 2011 the ownership was shared equally between the Västra Götaland Regional Council and the 49 municipalities in the region, from 1 January 2012 the county council is the sole owner. The fleet consists of approximately 1900 vehicles.

Operation

Västtrafik is the brand name which is printed on tickets and vehicles. Västtrafik has the responsibility, but the actual operation of traffic, including employment of staff and ownership of vehicles is done by separate operators. An exception is that Västtrafik for practical reasons (such as long delivery times for new vehicles) owns Västtrafik branded trains. Boats and trams are owned and operated by the respective municipality.

The whole of Gothenburg's public transport network is equipped with sensors which track the location of every bus or tram at any given time. The system allows riders to estimate when a tram or bus will be leaving from the next stop in real time. This information is displayed online and in bus and tram shelters, indicating any delays affecting the next bus or tram.

Violence against staff 
In 2018, train staff received body worn cameras after an escalating number of violence and threats against staff. The most common problematic situations arose when a single staff member checked a group of people where none had tickets. In such situations, staff members would be threatened and spat on.

Gallery

References

External links
Västtrafik website  - gives real time information on the Västtrafik system.
Västtrafik website 

Public transport authorities of Sweden
Railway companies of Sweden
Companies based in Västra Götaland County
Swedish companies established in 1998
Transport companies established in 1998